Aleksandar Nedović (Cyrillic: Александар Недовић; born 5 September 1978) is a Montenegrin football manager and former player. He last manages FK Budućnost Podgorica.

Playing career

Club

After starting out at Budućnost Podgorica in the First League of FR Yugoslavia, Nedović was transferred to Partizan in the 2001 winter transfer window. He made just three league appearances for the club over the course of three and a half years, but also spent some time on loan to Čukarički (2002) and Napredak Kruševac (2003).

In the 2008 winter transfer window, Nedović moved from Grbalj to fellow Montenegrin First League side Rudar Pljevlja. He later also played for Lovćen and Bar, before beginning his managerial career with Grbalj.

Honours
Partizan
 First League of FR Yugoslavia: 2001–02

References

External links
 
 
 
 

1978 births
Living people
Footballers from Podgorica
Association football midfielders
Serbia and Montenegro footballers
Montenegrin footballers
FK Budućnost Podgorica players
FK Rudar Pljevlja players
FK Partizan players
FK Čukarički players
FK Napredak Kruševac players
FC Volyn Lutsk players
FK Radnički Beograd players
Shamakhi FK players
OFK Grbalj players
FK Lovćen players
OFK Bar players
First League of Serbia and Montenegro players
Ukrainian Premier League players
Azerbaijan Premier League players
Montenegrin First League players
Serbia and Montenegro expatriate footballers
Expatriate footballers in Ukraine
Serbia and Montenegro expatriate sportspeople in Ukraine
Expatriate footballers in Azerbaijan
Serbia and Montenegro expatriate sportspeople in Azerbaijan
Montenegrin football managers
OFK Grbalj managers
OFK Titograd managers
FK Sutjeska Nikšić managers
OFK Petrovac managers
FK Iskra Danilovgrad managers